Claire Sheena Cowan (born 18 September 1981) is a South African former cricketer who played as a right-handed batter and wicket-keeper. She appeared in two Test matches for South Africa in 2003, on their tour of England. She played domestic cricket for Western Province.

References

External links
 
 

1981 births
Living people
Cricketers from Cape Town
South African women cricketers
South Africa women Test cricketers
Western Province women cricketers